Silesian Upland or Silesian Highland is a highland located in Silesia and Lesser Poland, Poland. 

Its highest point is the St. Anne Mountain (406 m).

See also
Silesian Lowlands
Silesian-Lusatian Lowlands
Silesian Foothills
Silesian-Moravian Foothills

Landforms of Silesian Voivodeship
Plateaus of Poland